Trente et Quarante is a 1945 French film directed by Gilles Grangier and starring Martine Carol.

The film was successful at the box office with admissions of 2,172,386 admissions.

References

External links
Film details at IMDb

1945 films
Films directed by Gilles Grangier
French black-and-white films
Films based on French novels
French musical comedy films
1945 musical comedy films
1940s French-language films
1940s French films